Berit Christoffersen (born 3 May 1973, in Virum) is a Danish rower. Along with Lene Andersson she finished 5th in the women's lightweight double sculls at the 1996 Summer Olympics.

References 
 
 

1973 births
Living people
Danish female rowers
Olympic rowers of Denmark
Rowers at the 1992 Summer Olympics
Rowers at the 1996 Summer Olympics
World Rowing Championships medalists for Denmark
People from Lyngby-Taarbæk Municipality
Sportspeople from the Capital Region of Denmark